The Daily Telegraph was a newspaper serving Napier and the Hawke's Bay region district of New Zealand. It was established in February 1871 by founding editor, London journalist, Richard Halkett Lord.

The paper remained in publication until 1999 when it merged with the Hawke's Bay Herald-Tribune to become Hawke's Bay Today.

References

External links
 The Napier Daily Telegraph

Defunct newspapers published in New Zealand
Publications established in 1871
Publications disestablished in 1999
Mass media in Napier, New Zealand
History of the Hawke's Bay Region